"A Million Dreams" is a song performed by Ziv Zaifman, Hugh Jackman and Michelle Williams for the film The Greatest Showman (2017). It is the second track from soundtrack of the film, The Greatest Showman: Original Motion Picture Soundtrack, released in the same year.

Covers
 The song was covered by Susan Boyle and Michael Ball on Boyle's 2019 album, Ten.
 Shalva Band performed a cover of the song as an interval act in the second semi-final of the Eurovision Song Contest 2019.
 The a cappella group Voctave and the barbershop chorus Vocal Majority collaborated to cover the song; it was released on Vocal Majority's 2018 album, also titled A Million Dreams.
 The Fron Male Voice Choir covered the song on their album Voices of the Valley Echoes, released in February 2020.
 Christina Aguilera covered the song during her performance at Expo 2020 closing ceremony on March 31, 2022.

Charts

Certifications

Reprise

"A Million Dreams (Reprise)" is the reprise of the song "A Million Dreams" from The Greatest Showman: Original Motion Picture Soundtrack. The song like the original is sung by Hugh Jackman but is this time joined by his character's daughters played by Austyn Johnson and Cameron Seely.

Certifications

Reimagined version

On October 24, 2018, American singer Pink released her cover of the song for the 2018 album The Greatest Showman: Reimagined. The song was the second single from the album and was released along with a cover of the reprise sung by P!nk's daughter Willow Sage Hart.

Charts

Weekly charts

Year-end charts

Certifications

References

2017 songs
2018 singles
Atlantic Records singles
Hugh Jackman songs
Pink (singer) songs
Songs written by Benj Pasek
Songs written by Justin Paul (songwriter)
Songs from The Greatest Showman
Songs from Pasek and Paul musicals